James Anthony Fallon (born 27 March 1965) is an English former rugby union and rugby league footballer who played in the 1990s.

References

External links
Statistics at rugbyleagueproject.org
Profile at therhinos.co.uk
Profile at ESPN Scrum

1965 births
Living people
Bath Rugby players
English rugby league players
English rugby union players
Leeds Rhinos players
Richmond F.C. players
Rugby league players from Berkshire
Rugby league wingers
Rugby union wings
Rugby union players from Windsor, Berkshire